Meridian Bank could refer to:

Institutions
 Crédit Agricole Srbija
 Meridian Bank (Canada)
 UMB Financial Corporation

Buildings
Meridian Bank Tower (Phoenix)